The Maya or Mayan Region is one of various common first-order sub-divisions of Mesoamerica. Though first settled by Palaeoindians by at least 10,000 BC, it is now most commonly characterised and recognised as the territory which encompassed the Mayan civilisation in the pre-Columbian era.

Extent 
The Mayan Region is firmly bounded to the north, east, and southwest by the Gulf of Mexico, the Caribbean Sea, and the Pacific Ocean, respectively. It is less firmly bounded to the west and southeast by 'zones of cultural interaction and transition between Maya and non-Maya peoples.' The western transition between Mayan and non-Mayan peoples roughly corresponds to the Isthmus of Tehuantepec, while the southeastern one roughly corresponds to a line running northwards from the mouth of the Lempa River to that of the Ulua River.

Divisions 
The Mayan Region is traditionally sub-divided into three zones, ie the Mayan Lowlands, Mayan Highlands, and the Mayan Pacific. The Region's internal borders, like some of its external ones, are not usually precisely fixed, as they are rather demarcated by 'subtle environmental changes or transitions from one zone to another.' Additionally, the Lowlands, Highlands, and Pacific are often further sub-divided along similarly imprecise lines, giving rise to a myriad roughly-demarcated second-order sub-divisions for the Mayan Region.

Lowlands 

The Mayan Lowlands are a low-lying karstic plain stretching from Campeche in Mexico through northern Guatemala and into northwestern Honduras, thereby encompassing all of the Yucatan Peninsula and its abutting plains (including all of Belize). The plain generally lies below . Wet seasons range from six to eleven months (usually starting in May or June), with dry seasons ranging from one to six months.

Highlands 

The Mayan Highlands are a geologically-active east-west band of peaks and valleys stretching from Tabasco in Mexico through central Guatemala and into northwestern Honduras, and generally topping . Wet seasons typically last eight months (MayDecember), with dry seasons typically compressed to four (JanuaryApril).

Pacific 
The Mayan Pacific, also known as the Pacific Coastal Plain, is a fertile volcanic-sedimentary plain stretching along the Pacific coast from Chiapas in Mexico through southern Guatemala and into western El Salvador. Wet seasons typically last eight months (MayDecember), with dry seasons typically compressed to four (JanuaryApril).

Geography

Physical 
The Mayan Region is 'one of the most varied environments on earth.' Its terrain ranges from vast sea-level plains to near-inaccessible peaks topping 10,000 feet (3,000 m). Its soils range from rich alluvial and volcanic types to poor karstic ones, resulting in vegetation ranging from lush to sparse. Mean annual temperatures and rainfall range within  and 20160 inches (5004,000 mm), respectively. Wet seasons range from six to eleven months, with dry seasons ranging from one to six months. Surface freshwater is readily available year-round in some areas, and virtually absent in others.

Geology

History

Pre-Cenozoic 
Middle America, including the Mayan Region, is thought to have taken shape sometime after 170 million years ago. Its formation is thought to have 'involved [the] complex movement of [various] crustal blocks and terrains between the two pre-existing continental masses [ie North and South America].' Details of the pre-Cenozoic portion of this process (ie 17067 million years ago), however, are not widely agreed upon. Nonetheless, it has been proposed that the northern Lowlands were subaerially exposed by some 150 million years ago.

Cenozoic 
Details of the Cenozoic (ie 660 million years ago) geologic history of Middle America, including the Mayan Region, are relatively more widely agreed upon. In broad strokes, the Mayan Highlands and Pacific are thought to have been subaerially exposed by some 40 million years ago, with these being initially separated from the northern Lowlands by the incipient Bay of Honduras. The Bay is thought to have closed by at least 20 million years ago, thereby finally linking the northern and southern portions of the Mayan Region together.

Timeline

Morphology

Provinces 

The Mayan Region is thought to fully or partially encompass at least fourteen geologic provinces.

Basins 
The Mayan Region is believed to fully or partially comprehend at least five sedimentary basins.

Tectonics 
The majority of the Mayan Region sits on the Maya Block of the North American Plate, though its southernmost extremes extend beyond this crustal fragment into the neighbouring Chortis Block of the Caribbean Plate. The Region notably houses the MotaguaPolochic Fault Zone in the south, part of the Central American Volcanic Front in the southwest, and further borders the Eastern Mexican Transform to the west.

Stratigraphy 

The Mayan Region's pre-Mesozoic crystalline basement is only exposed in the Mixtequita or Guichicovi Complex, the Chiapas Massif, the Altos Cuchumatanes, the Maya Mountains, and along the Chicxulub impact crater. It is elsewhere blanketed by extensive Mesozoic sedimentary cover.

Notes and references

Explanatory footnotes

Short citations

Full citations

Print

Journals

Theses

Other 
 
 
 
 
 

Geography of Mesoamerica
Pre-Columbian cultural areas